Scoliokona is a genus of moths in the family Sesiidae.

Species

 Scoliokona baliensis Gorbunov, 2021
 Scoliokona cyanea (Hampson, 1919)
 Scoliokona cyanogama Meyrick, 1930
 Scoliokona heptapora Kallies & Arita, 1998
 Scoliokona hyalina Arita & Gorbunov, 2003
 Scoliokona kalliesi Arita & Riefenstahl, 2004
 Scoliokona nanlingensis Kallies & Arita, 2014
 Scoliokona phoenicia (Hampson, 1919)
 Scoliokona shimentai Kallies & Wu, 2014
 Scoliokona spissa Kallies & Arita, 2014
 Scoliokona stroehlei (Fischer, 2002)
 Scoliokona tetrapora (Diakonoff, 1968)
 Scoliokona uncariae (Schneider, 1940)
 Scoliokona zygophora (Hampson, 1919)

References

Sesiidae